Bowe v R is a 2006 Judicial Committee of the Privy Council (JCPC) case in which it was held that it was unconstitutional in the Bahamas for capital punishment to be the mandatory sentence for murder. The JCPC held that because the Constitution of the Bahamas contains a qualified right to life and prohibits "inhuman or degrading punishment", following a murder conviction, a trial judge must have discretion to impose a lesser penalty than death by hanging; capital punishment may be applied only in those cases that contain aggravating factors as compared to other murder cases.

The result in the case reflected the findings R v Hughes, Fox v R, and Reyes v R, 2002 JCPC rulings from other Caribbean jurisdictions.

See also
Boyce v R
Matthew v S

External links
Bowe v R, bailii.org

2006 in case law
2006 in the Bahamas
Death penalty case law
Judicial Committee of the Privy Council cases on appeal from the Bahamas
Prisoners sentenced to death by the Bahamas
Murder in the Bahamas
Human rights in the Bahamas